The Libera Award for Best Hip-Hop/Rap Record (known as Best Hip-Hop/Rap Album prior to 2021) is an award presented by the American Association of Independent Music at the annual Libera Award which recognizes "best hip hop or rap album released commercially in the United States by an independent label" since 2017.

Winners and nominees

Artists that received multiple wins
2 wins
Run the Jewels

Artists that received multiple nominations
2 nominations
Clipping
Little Simz
Run the Jewels

References

Libera Awards